Ramsdell is a small village in the civil parish of Wootton St Lawrence with Ramsdell, in the Basingstoke and Deane district, in the English county of Hampshire. Ramsdell neighbours with Charter Alley only 1/2 mile up the road. Ramsdell lies near other towns the largest being Basingstoke (7 miles) with Newbury only  in the other direction. Other nearby villages include West Heath, Stoney Heath, Baughurst, Monk Sherborne, and Wootton St Lawrence.

Village life
Ramsdell is a typical English village with the church traditionally being the main focal point and also with a cricket ground, village hall and a community tennis court located by the cricket ground along with a children's play park. The focal point of the village is the cross roads right in the centre where Basingstoke Road meets Ewhurst Lane and Monk Sherborne road. Christ Church is located on one of the corners with the village hall nearby.

Events in Ramsdell include weekly cricket matches in the summer months, a bi-annual Fete and an annual village tennis tournament. There is also a monthly ladies' club meeting in the village hall. The local pub is called the White Hart.

Transport
From Basingstoke the M3 links to London and Southampton. A daily Stagecoach South bus service runs through Ramsdell linking up the Basingstoke hospital and on into the town centre. A service also operates in term time to the Clere school and St. Gabriel's School both in Newbury. The nearest international airports are Southampton and London Heathrow

References

External links

Ramsdell conservation area proposal
Graves in Christ Church cemetery

Villages in Hampshire
Basingstoke and Deane